Maruja García beach, commonly called Playa Maruja, is located in the Spanish municipalities of Motril and Torrenueva Costa, in the province of Granada, autonomous community of Andalusia.

With a width of about 15 meters, it is a dark sand beach that runs along 300 m of coastline between the Port of Motril and Torrenueva Costa. It is located between Playa del Cañón and Playa de La Chincheta. Easily accessible, it has a low occupancy level.

It is one of the most recommended beaches to visit on the Costa Tropical.

The beach refers to Maruja García, a neighbor of the municipality of Torrenueva Costa, named in her honor on behalf of all the mothers, grandmothers and working women of the municipality.

See also 
Torrenueva Costa
Costa Tropical

References

External links 
 Maruja García Beach
 View at Google Maps
 Maruja García Beach at TripAdvisor

Granada
Province of Granada
Populated places in the Province of Granada
Beaches of Andalusia